In Greek mythology, Athenaeus tells a tale of how Agamemnon mourned the loss of his friend or lover Argynnus, a boy from Boeotia, when he drowned in the Cephisus river. He buried him, honored with a tomb and a shrine to Aphrodite Argynnis. This episode is also found in Clement of Alexandria, in Stephen of Byzantium (Kopai and Argunnos), and in Propertius, III with minor variations.

Notes

References 

 Athenaeus of Naucratis, The Deipnosophists or Banquet of the Learned. London. Henry G. Bohn, York Street, Covent Garden. 1854. Online version at the Perseus Digital Library.
 Athenaeus of Naucratis, Deipnosophistae. Kaibel. In Aedibus B.G. Teubneri. Lipsiae. 1887. Greek text available at the Perseus Digital Library.
 Stephanus of Byzantium, Stephani Byzantii Ethnicorum quae supersunt, edited by August Meineike (1790-1870), published 1849. A few entries from this important ancient handbook of place names have been translated by Brady Kiesling. Online version at the Topos Text Project.

Boeotian characters in Greek mythology
LGBT themes in Greek mythology